Conus wandae is a species of sea snail, a marine gastropod mollusc in the family Conidae, the cone snails, cone shells or cones.

These snails are predatory and venomous. They are capable of "stinging" humans.

Description
The size of the shell varies between 20 mm and 33 mm. It is the morphotype of Africonus borgesi var. ervatao  Tenorio, M.J., C.M.L. Afonso, R.L. Cunha & E.M. Rolán, 2014.

Distribution
This marine species occurs in the Atlantic Ocean off Boa Vista Island, Cape Verde.

References

 Cossignani (2014), Malacologia Mostra Mondiale 82: 22-23

External links
 Illustrated Catalog of the Living Cone Shells: Conus wandae

wandae
Gastropods described in 2014
Gastropods of Cape Verde
Fauna of Boa Vista, Cape Verde